The 1920–21 season was the 12th year of football played by Dundee Hibernian. The team played in the Central League. There had been only one division in the Scottish Football League since the suspension of the Second Division during the Great War. Due to the failure of a proposal to restore the Second Division, which Dundee Hibs had expected to be in, many of its prospective teams joined the Central as a rival competition.  Dundee Hibs failed to qualify for the Scottish Cup, losing in the Qualifying Cup to local rivals Arbroath after two replays.

Match results
Dundee Hibernian played a total of ?? matches during the 1920–21 season.

Legend

All results are written with Dundee Hibernian's score first.
Own goals in italics

Scottish Qualifying Cup

References

Dundee United F.C. seasons
Dundee Hibernian